Morganella may refer to:

Surname
 Michel Morganella (born 17 May 1989), a Swiss footballer 
 Michele Morganella (born 25 April 1986), an Italian footballer 

Taxonomic genus
 Morganella (bacterium), a genus of bacteria containing the single species Morganella morganii
 Morganella (fungus), a genus of puffball fungi in the family Agaricaceae
 Morganella (insect), a scale insect genus in the family Diaspididae
 Morganella (brachiopod), a Devonian period brachiopod in the family Araksalosiidae

Specific epithet
 Phyllophaga morganella a species of New World scarab beetle in the family Melolonthidae. (See: Phyllophaga)

See also
 Morganiella, a genus of small flies in the family Mycetophilidae